Rupavati (pronounced rūpavati, meaning the beautiful one) is a rāgam in Carnatic music (musical scale of South Indian classical music). It is the 12th melakarta rāgam (parent scale) in the 72 melakarta rāgam system of Carnatic music. It is one of the few rāgams given the same name by the Muthuswami Dikshitar school of Carnatic music.

Structure and Lakshana

It is the 6th rāgam in the 2nd chakra Netra. The mnemonic name is Netra-Sha. The mnemonic phrase is sa ra gi ma pa dhu nu. Its  structure (ascending and descending scale) is as follows (see swaras in Carnatic music for details on below notation and terms):
: 
: 

The notes used in this scale are shuddha rishabham, sadharana gandharam, shuddha madhyamam, shatsruthi dhaivatham and kakali nishadham. As it is a melakarta rāgam, by definition it is a sampurna rāgam (has all seven notes in ascending and descending scale). It is the shuddha madhyamam equivalent of Divyamani, which is the 48th melakarta scale.

Asampurna Melakarta 
Rupavati is also the original name given to the 12th Melakarta in the list compiled by Venkatamakhin. The notes used in the scale are the same, but the scales are svarantara-shadava raga (4 notes in ascending scale and 6 are used in descending scale).
: 
:

Janya rāgams 
Rupavati has a few minor janya rāgams (derived scales) associated with it. See List of janya rāgams for full list of rāgams associated with Rupavati scale.

Compositions
Here are a few common compositions sung in concerts, set to Rupavati.
Ne more bettina by Thyagaraja
Sri Krishna bhajare by Muthuswami Dikshitar
Paalayamaam Sree Parvatha Nandini by Dr. M. Balamuralikrishna

Related rāgams
This section covers the theoretical and scientific aspect of this rāgam.

Rupavati's notes when shifted using Graha bhedam, does not yield any melakarta rāgam. Graha bhedam is the step taken in keeping the relative note frequencies same, while shifting the shadjam to the next note in the rāgam.

Notes

References

Melakarta ragas